Brigitte Foster-Hylton OD (born 7 November 1974 in Saint Elizabeth, Jamaica) is a Jamaican 100m hurdler. She was the World Champion over 100m hurdles in 2009.

Like fellow Jamaican hurdler Delloreen Ennis-London she was not a successful hurdler until 2000, when she lowered her personal best by 65/100. Having improved greatly, she finished eighth at the 2000 Olympics. At Athens 2004 she pulled out of the semi-finals.

Foster-Hylton won the silver medal at the 2003 World Championships and the bronze medal at the 2005 World Championships.

At the 2008 Olympics in Beijing Foster-Hylton finished sixth in the final, but was only two-hundredths of a second behind the silver medallist.

Foster-Hylton's greatest achievement came in 2009 when she became World Champion at 100 metres hurdles at the World Championships in Berlin. She had previously won the 100 metres hurdles titles at both the Pan American Games (in 2003) and the Commonwealth Games (in 2006).

She has been married to the group managing director of National Commercial Bank Jamaica, Patrick Hylton, since 2005.

Personal bests
100 metres : 11.17 (2003)
100 metres hurdles : 12.45 (2003)

International competitions

Circuit finals

Personal life
Foster- Hylton is married to Jamaican banker Patrick Hylton. In 2016 she gave birth to a son, a year before Shelly-Ann Fraser-Pryce gave birth to hers in 2017.

References

External links

1974 births
Living people
Jamaican female hurdlers
Athletes (track and field) at the 2000 Summer Olympics
Athletes (track and field) at the 2004 Summer Olympics
Athletes (track and field) at the 2008 Summer Olympics
Athletes (track and field) at the 2012 Summer Olympics
Athletes (track and field) at the 2003 Pan American Games
Athletes (track and field) at the 1998 Commonwealth Games
Athletes (track and field) at the 2002 Commonwealth Games
Athletes (track and field) at the 2006 Commonwealth Games
Commonwealth Games gold medallists for Jamaica
Olympic athletes of Jamaica
People from Saint Elizabeth Parish
World Athletics Championships medalists
Pan American Games gold medalists for Jamaica
Commonwealth Games medallists in athletics
Pan American Games medalists in athletics (track and field)
World Athletics Championships winners
IAAF World Athletics Final winners
Medalists at the 2003 Pan American Games
Central American and Caribbean Games medalists in athletics
Medallists at the 2006 Commonwealth Games